Julien, Baron De Wilde (b. Wetteren, 7 January 1944) is a Belgian businessman. He is Chairman of Nyrstar, Chairman of the Prince Albert Fund Foundation, honorary chairman of Agoria and a member of the board of Bekaert, Telenet and Agfa-Gevaert. He was made a Baron by H.M. King Albert II in 2012.

Education
He graduated as Master of Science in Chemical Engineering at the Katholieke Universiteit Leuven (Leuven) in 1967.

Career
In 1969, he started his career as an engineer at Texaco Belgium (1969–1972). He was head of technical product management for Texaco Europe from 1972 until 1977. From 1977 until 1983, he was manager information systems for Texaco Belgium, the Netherlands and France. From 1983 until 1986, he was a member of the board of directors of Texaco Belgium and from 1986 until 1988 Texaco Europe.

From 1988 until 1989, he was head of the research and business development centre of Recticel, Belgium.

From 1993 until 1994, Julien De Wilde was General manager of Alcatel Bell, from 1996 until 1999 CEO of Alcatel Bell and from 1999 until 2002 Executive vice-president of the Alcatel Group.

From 2002 until 2006, he was CEO of Bekaert after which he was succeeded by baron Bert De Graeve.

Sources
 Julien De Wilde 
 Julien De Wilde: Het garantielabel van Nyrstar 

1944 births
Living people
Belgian businesspeople
KU Leuven alumni
Texaco people
People from Wetteren